Chlorhoda thoracica is a moth of the subfamily Arctiinae first described by Walter Rothschild in 1910. It is found in Peru.

The wingspan is about 39 mm.

References

Moths described in 1910
Arctiini